The Brushy Mountains are a mountain range located in northwestern North Carolina. They are an isolated "spur" of the much larger Blue Ridge Mountains, separated from them by the Yadkin River valley. A deeply eroded range, they move from the southwest to the northeast, and cross five counties in North Carolina: Caldwell, Alexander, Wilkes, Iredell, and Yadkin.

The Brushy Mountains divide, for much of their courses, the waters of the Yadkin River and the Catawba River, two of central North Carolina's largest rivers. The highest point in the chain is Pores Knob, in Wilkes County. Among the other notable peaks in the range are Hibriten Mountain in Caldwell County, which marks the western end of the Brushy Mountains and is a prominent landmark in the city of Lenoir, North Carolina; Hickory Knob, the highest point in Alexander County, North Carolina; and Fox Mountain, the highest point in Iredell County, North Carolina. The forests on the mountains are part of the Southeastern mixed forests ecoregion.

The Mountains are primarily known for their abundance of fruit orchards. The last Saturday in July is the Brushy Mountain Peach and Heritage Festival hosted by the Community Center and held in Downtown Wilkesboro. On the first Saturday in October, the Brushy Mountain Apple Festival is hosted by the Brushy Mountain Ruritan Club and held in North Wilkesboro, North Carolina each year to celebrate the harvest. The region was also once known as a hotbed of "moonshining", or the production of illegal homemade liquor. Several of the earliest stars of stock-car racing in the 1940s and 1950s got their start in the moonshining business in the Brushy Mountains. James Larkin Pearson, a newspaper publisher and editor who served as North Carolina's official Poet Laureate from 1953 to 1981, was born and raised in the Brushy Mountains, and lived in the Brushies his entire life. Much of his poetry was based on his life in the Brushy Mountains.

References 

 North Carolina: The History of a Southern State, Hugh Talmadge Lefler & Albert Ray Newsome, authors. University of North Carolina Press, 1973.

Blue Ridge Mountains
Mountain ranges of North Carolina
Subranges of the Appalachian Mountains
Landforms of Caldwell County, North Carolina
Landforms of Alexander County, North Carolina
Landforms of Wilkes County, North Carolina
Landforms of Iredell County, North Carolina
Landforms of Yadkin County, North Carolina
Inselbergs of Piedmont (United States)